Keachi United Methodist Church is a historic Methodist church located on Louisiana Highway 5 in Keachi in DeSoto Parish, Louisiana in northwestern Louisiana.

Built in 1879, it is a wood frame transitional Greek Revival/Gothic Revival church.  It has two front doors corresponding to two aisles inside.  It has a steep roof with a thin belfry and a pointed spire.  Greek Revival elements include gable end returns, a full entablature, and corner pilasters with molded capitals.  Gothic Revival elements include lancet arch windows and doors.  In 1988 the church was very well-preserved.

The church was added to the National Register of Historic Places on July 14, 1988.

See also
National Register of Historic Places listings in DeSoto Parish, Louisiana

References

United Methodist churches in Louisiana
Churches on the National Register of Historic Places in Louisiana
Greek Revival church buildings in Louisiana
Gothic Revival church buildings in Louisiana
Churches completed in 1879
Churches in DeSoto Parish, Louisiana
National Register of Historic Places in DeSoto Parish, Louisiana